The 1954 LFF Lyga was the 33rd season of the LFF Lyga football competition in Lithuania.  It was contested by 12 teams, and Inkaras Kaunas won the championship.

League standings

References
RSSSF

LFF Lyga seasons
1954 in Lithuania
LFF